Gregory Classen (born August 24, 1977) is a Canadian former professional ice hockey centre.

Playing career 
Classen played four seasons of junior hockey for the Nipawin Hawks of the SJHL. He then went on to play  two seasons of hockey at Merrimack College competing in the Hockey East Division of the NCAA. While at Merrimack, he earned a spot on the Hockey East All Rookie Team.

After going undrafted, Classen signed as a free agent in 1999 with the NHL‘s Nashville Predators . He spent his first five pro seasons in the Nashville Predators organization, splitting time between the parent club and the Milwaukee Admirals.

In 2004 Classen signed with Finland's SM-liiga club Ässät.  Returning to the Admirals for 2005–6, he played the following season in Germany with DEL club, the Hamburg Freezers.

On July 3, 2007, it was announced he had signed a contract with the Vancouver Canucks. He was then reassigned by the Canucks, and played with their American Hockey League affiliate, the Manitoba Moose.

He moved to fellow AHL team Providence Bruins the following season and after 1 game moved onto the San Antonio Rampage before leaving for German team, Iserlohn Roosters, where he spent the remainder of the 2008-09 campaign.

He started the 2009-10 season with the Rapperswil-Jona Lakers of the Swiss top flight, before transferring to second-division side EHC Basel Sharks during the season. In January 2010, he moved on to another Swiss team, HC Sierre-Anniviers.

On July 18, 2010, Classen returned to the German DEL and signed a two-year contract with Kölner Haie. After three seasons with Haie, Classen left as a free agent to sign with ERC Ingolstadt.

In 2014, he joined German second-division side Lausitzer Füchse on a two-year deal. On March 14, 2015, he was attacked with a knife and severely injured. He was hospitalized for almost a month and returned to game action in September 2015. Classen left the Füchse squad upon the conclusion of the 2015-16 campaign and was signed by fellow DEL2 side Starbulls Rosenheim on August 27, 2016.

Classen moved on to a Player-Assistant Coach role for two seasons (2017–18 and 2018–19) with the  Rostocker EC Piranhas of the German Eishockey-Oberliga.

Personal life 
Classen was born in Nipawin, Saskatchewan and was raised in Aylsham, Saskatchewan.

Classen's parents Gord and Marjorie were killed by an impaired driver in a head-on collision on Saskatchewan Highway 41 between Saskatoon and Aberdeen on January 23, 2020. Classen's hockey career ended abruptly as a result.

Career statistics

Awards and honors

References

External links

1977 births
Living people
Ässät players
Canadian ice hockey centres
Canadian people of German descent
Hamburg Freezers players
Ice hockey people from Saskatchewan
ERC Ingolstadt players
Iserlohn Roosters players
Kölner Haie players
Lausitzer Füchse players
Manitoba Moose players
Merrimack Warriors men's ice hockey players
Milwaukee Admirals players
Nashville Predators players
People from Nipawin, Saskatchewan
Providence Bruins players
Rostock Piranhas players
SC Rapperswil-Jona Lakers players
San Antonio Rampage players
Starbulls Rosenheim players
Undrafted National Hockey League players